A trampette is a small square trampoline used in gymnastics. In TeamGym, the trampette is positioned at the end of a runway in front of a mat. The trampette is adjusted at an angle, tilted towards the gymnast, who approaches the trampette at a run. The gymnast jumps onto the trampette and performs a somersault, landing on the mat. Part of the TeamGym trampette program is performed with a vaulting apparatus, which is positioned between the trampette and the mat.

See also
 European Gymnastics Championships
 European TeamGym Championships
 European Union of Gymnastics

References
European Union of Gymnastics, TeamGym Disciplines
Continental Sports Trampettes

Gymnastics
Trampolining